Nong Thung Thong is a swamp on the east bank of the Tapi River in Khian Sa District, Surat Thani Province, southern Thailand.

The area, together with the Nong Tung Ka on the west bank of the river, forms a complex of grassland and swamps along the river. During the end of the southwest monsoon and during the northeast monsoon (October–December) the area is almost completely flooded, while at the end of the dry season (March) most of the area is dry.

In 1975 an area of 29.6 km2 was declared a non-hunting area. In 1989 it was enlarged to 64.5 km2.

External links
Wetlands of SE Asia
 National Park, Wildlife and Plant Conservation Department (Thai)
Royal Gazette Issue 92 chapter 245 of December 2 1975 and Issue 106 chapter 7 of January 12 1989 (Thai)

Non-hunting areas of Thailand
Geography of Surat Thani province